The Afon Twrch is a short river in Carmarthenshire, West Wales. It joins the River Cothi (itself a left-bank tributary of the River Towy) at the village of Pumsaint, near to which are the Roman gold mines of Dolaucothi.

References

Twrch
Twrch